Petaling Street Warriors is a film co-directed by James Lee Thim Heng and Sampson Yuen Choi-Hin through Malaysian production company, Juita Entertainment, a subsidiary of Juita Viden. Jointly presented by Juita Viden and Golden Screen Cinemas (GSC), it is the first period kungfu comedy to be produced locally in Malaysia and Singapore, with famed action choreographer from Hong Kong, Yuk-Sing Ma, who have worked on Hong Kong and China's blockbusters, such as Storm Riders 2 and A Chinese Fairy Tale.

The story took two years of research work and preparation. The production of the film took place earlier than Namewee's Nasi Lemak 2.0, but as Nasi Lemak 2.0 was released earlier, Petaling Street Warriors thus has become the second full-length movie Namewee would star in 2011.

After viewing the film as it underwent post-production work in Hong Kong, numerous Hong Kong filmmakers call the film as the "watershed" and "milestone" in the history of Malaysian Chinese film industry.

Petaling Street Warriors would be released in cinemas nationwide in Malaysia (1 December 2011) and Singapore (29 December 2011). Cinema chains that will be playing the film in Malaysia include GSC, TGV, Cathay, Big, LFS, MBO, Star, First World, Mega Prai and also Brunei Mall. In Singapore, the film will be shown via Shaw, Cathay, Eng Wah, Filmgarde Cineplex and Golden Village's circuits.

Its gala premieres have been held at 9:30 pm on 25 November 2011 at GSC Pavilion KL, Malaysia, and at 8:45 pm on 19 December 2011 at Shaw Theatres LIDO, Singapore. Although its official showing date in Singapore is 5 January, its sneak preview screenings has started since 23 December.

Since opening on 1 December, its first 4-day box office collection (MYR1.4 million) has surpassed that of Nasi Lemak 2.0 (MYR 1 million). It was also the highest-grossing Chinese film in the week it was first shown.

The movie is also available in original and dubbed-in-Malay versions on Astro First between 12 January and 15 February 2012

Based on a controversial legend
The film is inspired by a controversial legend about the Jianwen Emperor of the Ming dynasty, who is rumoured to have fled to Southeast Asia when he was dethroned in the year 1402 by his uncle, Zhu Di, who later became the Yongle Emperor. Some historians have even argued that the true purpose of the Voyages of Zheng he – which began three years after the Yongle Emperor ascended the throne – was not for the sake of trade or the promotion of national pride, but to seek out the Jianwen Emperor who was suspected to be hiding in the region. During the seven voyages, Zheng He's fleets had stopped in Malacca (now a Malaysian state) for five times. Malacca served as a transit centre for replenishment of supplies for his fleets.

History
The role of Liu Kun 刘坤 was at first offered to Chapman To Man Zaak, but the shooting dates clashed with his schedule. As a result, the Malaysian controversial singer, Namewee, was chosen to take up the role. At that time, his Nasi Lemak 2.0 was not made yet, so this is actually Namewee's first involvement as an actor in any full-length features.

Petaling Street Warriors was initially planned to be released at the same time in Singapore and Malaysia during Chinese New Year of 2012.

Plot
Set against the background of Petaling Street in 1908, Petaling Street Warriors tells the story of a pair of married couple, Shi Duyao (Mark Lee) and Zhung Lichun (Yeo Yann Yann), who operate a Hokkien mee stall in Petaling Street, where they suffer from the inefficiency of the colonial government and suppression by the Chinese gangsters. While trying to impress his wife, Duyao encounters a mysterious yet strikingly beautiful kungfu expert, Xiaoju (Chris Tong), who claims that Duyao is a descendant of the missing Jianwen Emperor of the Ming dynasty. To stop a group of Qing warriors and Japanese ninjas from robbing a treasure map that Duyao doesn't even know he has, Lichun and her cousin, Liu Kun (Namewee), finally reveal their kungfu, turning Petaling Street into the ultimate battleground. Facing enemies of unthinkable powers, could Duyao unravel the mystery of his real identity and come to his wife's rescue just in time?

Catchphrase
The main character, Shi Duyao, often utters a catchphrase "jidut". While "ji" is understood to be "chicken" in Mandarin, "dut" has no meaning. As he uses "jidut" to express his happy and upset moods, "jidut" could either mean "damn it" or "hell, yeah", depending on the situations.

Cast
 Mark Lee 李国煌 as Shi Duyao 史都耀
 Yeo Yann Yann 杨雁雁 as Zhung Lichun 钟离春
 Namewee 黄明志 as Liu Kun 刘坤
 Chris Tong 童冰玉 as Xiaoju 小菊
 Frederick Lee 李洺中 as Ma Fuyi 马福仪
 Sunny Pang 冯推守 as Wilson Ng 吴卫生
 Alvin Wong 王骏 as Yong Kok 杨过
 Ramasundran Rengan as Rajoo
 Henry Thia 程旭辉 as casino boss, Jay Chow 周董
 Chua Bee Seong 蔡炜祥 as Fok Yip Fei 霍叶飞
 Nick Dorian as Captain McBribe
 Chen Huen Phuei 曾宏辉 as translator-police officer
 John Cheng 钟耀南 as the head of Hokkien gang
 Tung Yew Ngai 邓有毅 as the right-hand man of Hokkien gang
 Rosanne Lui 吕珊 as Selina
 Brandon Yuen as the head of Cantonese gang
 Wong Wai Hoong 黄伟雄 as the right-hand man of Cantonese gang
 Goh You Ping 吴友凭 as spy
 Gan Hui Yee 颜慧仪 as Mahjie
 Chee Cheong Hoe 朱宥六 as fortune teller
 Berg Lee Seng Wan as mamasan
 Ho Yuhang 何宇恒 as one of the heads of Three Knives Gang
 Kin Wah 周梓华 as one of the heads of Three Knives Gang
 Daniel Wong Kian Huat 王健发 as one of the heads of Three Knives Gang
 Rayson Tan 陈泰铭 as Sun Yat-sen
 Steve Yap 叶良财 as the Jianwen Emperor
 Chen Puie Heng 陈沛兴 as imperial guard
 Chye Yang 蔡子洋 as imperial guard
Chong Yun Wah 张詠华 as imperial guard
Agnes Wong 王柔霖 as imperial guard

Anachronism
Scenes of comical anachronism were seen in the fight scene between Shi Duyao and the Qing eunuch, in which caricatures of Ip Man, Wong Fei Hung, Bruce Lee and even Michael Jackson were seen.

Box office
Petaling Street Warriors managed to rake in MYR1.4 million in its first four days compared to MYR434,000 by Hong Kong's Magic To Wins. Nasi Lemak 2.0's record is MYR1 million for its first four days. Its first six-day box office record is MYR1.73 million.

Critical response

Response from Hongkong Filmmakers
While undergoing post-production work in Hong Kong, it has received good response from numerous Hong Kong filmmakers. Ketsarinh Lan, producer of Painted Skin and A Chinese Fairy Tale, and chairman & CEO of Golden Sun Films Distribution Limited, thinks that it has a good story and great entertainment value. After viewing the movie, Percy Fung, the person in charge of the post-production & visual effects for Hero, The Banquet, The Assembly, and Kung Fu Dunk, believes that Petaling Street Warriors has reached the production standard of Hong Kong films, and it would become a watershed in the history of Malaysian Chinese film industry. Cheung Ka Lik, post production producer of Digital Magic Hong Kong, calls this film a milestone for its genre and production quality.

Response from Malaysia
According to a film review on New Straits Times, "the fighting scenes are quite impressive and are on par with their overseas counterparts.

Film reviewer, Jun Kin, described the film as "reeking of raw touches of a similar themed film called Kung Fu Hustle by Stephen Chow".

Malaysian blogger, Kaillery, claims that Petaling Street Warriors is a "comedy with depth" due to its reference to current political events and its well-grounded links to the political atmosphere of the year 1908.

In his blog review, blogger SCKHSMC2007 described the film as "in line and in tune to what most people are thirsting for", and gave the film a rating of 8/10.

Online film reviewer, The Movie Blogger Fella, claims Petaling Street Warriors to be "a smart film, something its detractors clearly fail to recognise".

Malaysian writer and independent filmmaker, Amir Muhammad, claims that Petaling Street Warriors reminded him of the robust iconoclasm of Ali Baba Bujang Lapok. According to his blog review, "the movie was effortlessly political as it flipped about notions of citizenship and governance", and it "shows that mish-mash of pop genres, when handled with wit and verve, can be utterly zany and utterly serious at the same time". He explained that the ending of Petaling Street Warriors is "in the spirit of democratic optimism: it's only when we give up inherited privileges that we can truly live (together)".

Response from Singapore
Stefan S through his blog, A Nutshell Review, claims that Petaling Street Warriors "is steep in political and social allusions if you dig beyond its entertaining surface, and doing so without being overtly offensive in the points its trying to make, falling back on good ol' humour to diffuse any potential unhappiness", and it's "a film that's plenty of fun, chock full of stars to provide it that boost in entertainment value".

While the movie is slammed for stealing the resurrection scene from Kung Fu Hustle by some readers of Lianhe Zhaobao, its Facebook admin claims that the idea came from a classic Hong Kong TV series, Silk (Tian Can Bian), from which Kung Fu Hustle conceived its resurrection scene at the very first place. According to the admin, it is a parody scene purposely created by Hong Kong choreographer Ma Yuk-Sing to make fun of this cliché plot.

References

External links 
 

2011 films
Malaysian action comedy films
Films directed by James Lee
Chinese-language Malaysian films
2010s English-language films